The 2020 CONCACAF League (officially the 2020 Scotiabank CONCACAF League for sponsorship purposes) was the fourth edition of the CONCACAF League, a football club competition organized by CONCACAF, the regional governing body of North America, Central America, and the Caribbean.

Due to the COVID-19 pandemic, CONCACAF announced on 23 June 2020 that the start of the tournament, which was scheduled to begin on 28 July 2020 and end in November, had been postponed. On 7 August 2020, they announced the tournament would begin on 20 October and end on 28 January 2021. To ease the schedule, CONCACAF originally announced that the preliminary round and round of 16 would be played as single-leg matches, but on 29 October 2020, CONCACAF announced that this format had been extended to all rounds, with ties hosted by the higher-seeded teams based on the CONCACAF Club Ranking. The final was also rescheduled to 3 February 2021.

Alajuelense defeated title holders Saprissa in the final to win their first CONCACAF League title. As winners, they and the next best five teams qualified for the 2021 CONCACAF Champions League. After the format change of all rounds to single-leg matches, it was decided a play-in round would be added for the four losing quarter-finalists to compete for the last two places in the CONCACAF Champions League.

Qualification
A total of 22 teams participated in the CONCACAF League:
North American Zone: 1 team (from one association)
Central American Zone: 18 teams (from seven associations)
Caribbean Zone: 3 teams (from two or three associations)

Therefore, teams from either 10 or 11 out of the 41 CONCACAF member associations could participate in the CONCACAF League.

North America
The one berth for the North American Zone (NAFU) was allocated to the Canadian Soccer Association through the previous year's Canadian Premier League, where the champions, decided by the Canadian Premier League Finals, contested between the Spring and Fall season champions, qualified. They were the second Canadian representative included in CONCACAF competitions, not including the Canadian Championship winners which qualified for the CONCACAF Champions League.

Central America
The 18 berths for the Central American Football Union (UNCAF), which consisted of seven member associations, were allocated as follows: three berths for each of Costa Rica, El Salvador, Guatemala, Honduras, Panama, two berths for Nicaragua, and one berth for Belize.

All of the leagues of Central America employed a split season with two tournaments in one season, so the following teams qualified for the CONCACAF League:
In the league of Costa Rica, both champions, and the non-champions with the best aggregate record, qualified. If there was any team which were champions of both tournaments, the non-champions with the second best aggregate record qualified.
In the leagues of El Salvador, Guatemala, Honduras, and Panama, both champions, and the runners-up with the better aggregate record (or any team which were runners-up of both tournaments), qualified. If there was any team which were finalists of both tournaments, the runners-up with the worse aggregate record qualify. If there were any two teams which were finalists of both tournaments, the semi-finalists with the best aggregate record would qualify.
In the league of Nicaragua, both champions qualified. If there was any team which were champions of both tournaments, the runners-up with the better aggregate record (or any team which were runners-up of both tournaments) qualified.
In the league of Belize, the champions with the better aggregate record (or any team which were champions of both tournaments) qualified.

If teams from any Central American associations were excluded, they were to be replaced by teams from other Central American associations, with the associations chosen based on results from previous CONCACAF League and CONCACAF Champions League tournaments.

Caribbean
The three berths for the Caribbean Football Union (CFU), which consisted of 31 member associations, were allocated via the CONCACAF Caribbean Club Championship and CONCACAF Caribbean Club Shield, the first-tier and second-tier subcontinental Caribbean club tournaments. Since 2018, the CONCACAF Caribbean Club Championship had been open to teams from professional leagues, where they could qualify as champions or runners-up of their respective association's league in the previous season, while the CONCACAF Caribbean Club Shield was open to teams from non-professional leagues, where they could qualify as champions of their respective association's league in the previous season.

Besides the champions of the CONCACAF Caribbean Club Championship which qualified for the CONCACAF Champions League, the runners-up and third-placed team of the CONCACAF Caribbean Club Championship, and the winners of a playoff between the fourth-placed team of the CONCACAF Caribbean Club Championship and the champions of the CONCACAF Caribbean Club Shield, qualified for the CONCACAF League. For the champions of the CONCACAF Caribbean Club Shield to be eligible for the playoff, they had to comply with the minimum CONCACAF Club Licensing requirements for the CONCACAF League.

Teams
The following 22 teams (from eleven associations) qualified for the tournament.
Ten teams entered in the round of 16: two each from Costa Rica, Honduras, and Panama, and one each from El Salvador, Guatemala, Nicaragua, and the Caribbean.
Twelve teams entered in the preliminary round: two each from El Salvador, Guatemala, and the Caribbean, and one each from Canada, Costa Rica, Honduras, Panama, Nicaragua, and Belize.

Due to the COVID-19 pandemic, the deadline for registration was extended to 28 June 2020.

Notes

Draw

The draw for the 2020 CONCACAF League was held on 21 September 2020, 19:00 EDT (UTC−4), at the CONCACAF headquarters in Miami, United States.

The draw determined each tie in the preliminary round (numbered 1 through 6) between a team from Pot 1 and a team from Pot 2, each containing six teams. A team from Pot 1 and a team from Pot 2 were drawn into each tie. Teams from the same association could not be drawn against each other in the preliminary round except for "wildcard" teams which could replace a team from another association.

The draw also determined each tie in the round of 16 (numbered 1 through 8) between a team from Pot 3 and a team from Pot 4, each containing eight teams, with the six preliminary round winners, whose identity was not known at the time of the draw, in Pot 4. A team from Pot 3 and a team from Pot 4 were drawn into each tie.

The seeding of teams was based on the CONCACAF Club Index. The CONCACAF Club Index, instead of ranking each team, was based on the on-field performance of the teams that had occupied the respective qualifying slots in the previous five editions of the CONCACAF League and CONCACAF Champions League. To determine the total points awarded to a slot in any single edition of the CONCACAF League or CONCACAF Champions League, CONCACAF used the following formula:

Teams qualified for the CONCACAF League based on criteria set by their association (e.g., tournament champions, runners-up, cup champions), resulting in an assigned slot (e.g., CRC1, CRC2) for each team.

The 22 teams were distributed in the pots as follows:

Format
In the CONCACAF League, the 22 teams played a single-elimination tournament. Each tie was played as a single match.
In all rounds except the final, if the score was tied after the end of regulation, a penalty shoot-out was used to determine the winner.
In the final, extra time was played if the score was tied after regulation. If the score was still tied after extra time, a penalty shoot-out was used to determine the winner.

Schedule
The schedule of the competition was as follows.

Times are Eastern Time, as listed by CONCACAF (local times are in parentheses):
Times up to 31 October 2020 (originally scheduled preliminary round matches) are Eastern Daylight Time, i.e., UTC−4.
Times thereafter (all other matches) are Eastern Standard Time, i.e., UTC−5.

Bracket

Preliminary round
In the preliminary round, the matchups were decided by draw: PR-1 through PR-6. The team from Pot 1 in the draw hosted the single-leg match.

Summary
Four of the six matches were played from 20–22 October 2020. Due to CONCACAF's COVID-19 testing protocol, one match was cancelled, and another match was rescheduled to 4 November.

|}

Matches

Round of 16
In the round of 16, the matchups were decided by draw: R16-1 through R16-8. The team from Pot 3 in the draw hosted the single-leg match, except for the match between Alajuelense and San Francisco, where the higher-seeded team based on the CONCACAF Club Ranking hosted the match.

Summary
Six of the eight matches were played from 3–5 November 2020. Due to CONCACAF's COVID-19 testing protocol, one match was rescheduled to 24 November. Another match was also rescheduled to 24 November due to the postponement of a preliminary round match.

|}

Matches

Quarter-finals
In the quarter-finals, the matchups were determined as follows:
QF1: Winner R16-1 vs. Winner R16-2
QF2: Winner R16-3 vs. Winner R16-4
QF3: Winner R16-5 vs. Winner R16-6
QF4: Winner R16-7 vs. Winner R16-8
The higher-seeded team based on the CONCACAF Club Ranking hosted the single-leg match.

Summary
The winners of the quarter-finals qualified for the 2021 CONCACAF Champions League. The losers entered the play-in round. The matches were played on 1–2 December 2020.

|}

Matches

Play-in round
In the play-in, the matchups were determined as follows:
PI1: Loser QF1 vs. Loser QF2
PI2: Loser QF3 vs. Loser QF4
The higher-seeded team based on the CONCACAF Club Ranking hosted the single-leg match.

Summary
The winners of the play-in round qualified for the 2021 CONCACAF Champions League. The matches were played on 8 and 9 December 2020.

|}

Matches

Semi-finals
In the semi-finals, the matchups were determined as follows:
SF1: Winner QF1 vs. Winner QF2
SF2: Winner QF3 vs. Winner QF4
The higher-seeded team based on the CONCACAF Club Ranking hosted the single-leg match.

Summary
The matches were played on 20 and 22 January 2021.

|}

Matches

Final

In the final (Winner SF1 vs. Winner SF2), the higher-seeded team based on the CONCACAF Club Ranking hosted the single-leg match.

Summary
The match was played on 3 February 2021.

|}

Match

Top goalscorers

Qualification to CONCACAF Champions League
The top six teams qualified for the 2021 CONCACAF Champions League, i.e., champions, runners-up, both losing semi-finalists, and the two winners of the play-in round contested by the four losing quarter-finalists.

Awards
The following awards were given at the conclusion of the tournament:

See also
2021 CONCACAF Champions League

Notes

References

External links

 
2020
2
2021 CONCACAF Champions League
Association football events postponed due to the COVID-19 pandemic
October 2020 sports events in North America
November 2020 sports events in North America
December 2020 sports events in North America
January 2021 sports events in North America
February 2021 sports events in North America